Sigrun Otto  (a.k.a. Sigrun Enersen Otto, April 13, 1896 – August 15, 1980) was a Norwegian actress. She was married to the theater director Reidar Otto.

Otto was born in Kristiania (now Oslo), the daughter of Otto Enersen and Thora Emilie Enersen. She debuted in 1912 and was employed at the Central Theater from  1914 to 1959. She married Reidar Otto in 1919. In addition to theater roles, she also appeared in several Norwegian films, and she played roles in NRK's Television Theater and Radio Theater departments.

Filmography
1942: Jeg drepte!, Miss Bull
1946: Vi vil leve
1946: To liv, Else Nordgaard, Ivar Nordgaard's wife
1947: Sankt Hans fest, Mrs. Christensen
1951: Kranes konditori, Mrs. Breien
1951: Skadeskutt, Else's mother
1952: Trine!, Mrs. Jahnfeldt, Jens's mother
1953: Brudebuketten, conscientious mother
1955: The Summer Wind Blows, Klaus's mother
1959: Støv på hjernen
1960: Ungen (TV), Lagerta 
1961: Den evige ektemann (TV), Marja Syssojevna 
1963: Elskere, Gudleik's mother
1964: Alle tiders kupp, Kari's mother
1964: Nydelige nelliker, milk woman

References

20th-century Norwegian actresses
Actresses from Oslo
1896 births
1980 deaths